No7 is a beauty brand of anti-ageing creams, skincare and cosmetic products developed by Boots in the United Kingdom. 
The brand No7 was launched by Boots in 1935 as a selection of eleven skincare products and was expanded in 1937 with some colour cosmetics. Since its introduction, the brand has undergone eight redesigns. In 2007, Boots expanded the range to incorporate body products, foundation, creams and men's skincare.

In 2021, Walgreens Boots Alliance (WBA), the company owning the brand, launched No7 as a separate company. 

No7's products and services are available in over 20,000 stores and online, in 16 markets worldwide.

References

External links 

 Official website

1935 establishments in the United Kingdom
Walgreens Boots Alliance
Anti-aging substances
British brands
Cosmetics brands
Personal care brands